George Barati (born György Braunstein) (April 3, 1913, Győr, Hungary - June 22, 1996, San Jose, California) was a Hungarian-American cellist, composer, and conductor.

Barati studied under Zoltán Kodály and Leo Weiner while a student at the Liszt Academy of Music in the 1930s, and became widely known as a performer throughout Hungary, both as a soloist and with the Pro Ideale Quartet. He immigrated to the United States in 1938, where he studied composition at Princeton under Roger Sessions and taught cello performance until 1943. He then relocated to California, where he was cellist with the San Francisco Symphony Orchestra (1946–50) and worked with chamber ensembles.

In 1950, Barati moved to Oahu, where he became the conductor of the Honolulu Symphony Orchestra, a position he held from 1950 to 1967. He also began doing international tours as a conductor. He returned to California in 1968 and was co-director of the Villa Montalvo Center for Art in Saratoga, California, from 1971 to 1980 he directed the Santa Cruz County Symphony Orchestra.

Works (selection) 
 Chant of Light for orchestra
 Chant of Darkness for orchestra
 The Dragon and the Phoenix
 3 Inventionen for timpani
 Kammerkonzert
 Lumberjack for trombone
 Polarization for orchestra
 Quartet for harpsichord, flute, oboe and doublebass
 Sonate for violin and piano
 Symphony n°1 Alpine
 Triple Exposure for cello

References
 Kathleen Haefliger/Jonas Westover, "George Barati". The New Grove Dictionary of Music and Musicians. 2nd edition, 2001.

1913 births
1996 deaths
American cellists
American composers
American male conductors (music)
Hungarian emigrants to the United States
People from Győr
American male composers
20th-century American conductors (music)
20th-century American male musicians
20th-century cellists